Zdeněk Fifka is a retired Czechoslovak slalom canoeist who competed in the mid-to-late 1960s. He won a silver medal in the C-2 event at the 1965 ICF Canoe Slalom World Championships in Spittal.

References

Czechoslovak male canoeists
Living people
Year of birth missing (living people)
Medalists at the ICF Canoe Slalom World Championships